Geoff Paine is an Australian television and theatre actor from Melbourne. After graduating from drama school Paine secured a role on the soap opera Neighbours, playing the role of doctor Clive Gibbons. He remained in the role for one year before leaving to pursue other projects. He returned to the role briefly in 1989, with the opportunity to appear in a spin-off series based on the character, but no television network would produce the show. Paine continued his career with roles in A Country Practice and the comedy sketch show The Comedy Company. He also concentrated on his stage career gaining roles in productions that toured Australia, including various projects at the Melbourne International Comedy Festival.

He continued to appear on television with numerous guest roles in dramas. He later started his own production company, then wrote and starred in his own play, Unpack This, which was based on his own experiences. Other regular roles include his appearances as Malcolm Wilson in the Nine Network children's television series Pig's Breakfast and as Malcom Mann in ABC3's Mal.com. In 2017, Paine decided to return to Neighbours as Clive and continued to appear on a recurring basis until the show’s ending in 2022.

Career
To start his career, Paine attended drama school for three years. In 1986, Paine secured the role of Clive Gibbons in the Australian soap opera Neighbours. This was his first television acting role after he had graduated. Paine was approached by Neighbours casting department to audition, after they watched him perform in a play at the Victorian Arts Centre. In November 1986, TV Week reported that Paine had quit the series but would remain on-screen until early 1987. In a 1988 interview, Paine stated that he feared he would become typecast in the role and did not regret leaving. The actor later made a brief return to the show in 1989. Clive became popular with viewers and this return was scripted to set up a spin-off series, City Hospital. A pilot was made, but it was not picked up by any television networks. Paine moved to London briefly before returning to live in Australia. Neighbours had achieved success in the United Kingdom and he was often approached by fans in the street.

He went on to appear in episodes of the Seven Network soap opera A Country Practice as Jeff Ryan during 1987, 1988 and 1989. Paine began appearing in the sketch show The Comedy Company when it returned for its 1990 season. In 1996, Paine secured the guest role of Roman in Blue Heelers. Paine found the role "interesting" because Roman "is not what he seems." On 13 November 1997, he appeared in an episode of State Coroner as a farmer, Barry Davis who is murdered. In 1999, Paine secured the role of newsreader Malcolm Wilson in the Nine Network children's television series Pig's Breakfast. He reprised the role for the show's second series.

Other acting credits include guest roles in The Games, The Adventures of Lano and Woodley, Stingers, The Wedge, City Homicide, Wilfred and The Doctor Blake Mysteries . Paine has also tried to secure film roles and has appeared in The Craic (1999), The Wog Boy (2000) and The Wedding Party (2010).

In early 2011, he took the role of Malcom Mann in Mal.com. The show was created for a young audience and Malcom is a television host who is also secretly a robot. The show debuted via ABC3 on 28 October 2011. In 2013, he secured a presenting role on Spontaneous Saturday which featured theatresport-type games. The two episode pilot was produced for the SBS network.

In 2017, Paine reprised his role of Clive in Neighbours, twenty-eight years after he had last been on the show. Paine's return came after he made an enquiry to the Neighbours production team via his agent. He had been asked to return previously but could not because of family and other work commitments. Paine remained with Neighbours on a recurring basis, filming episodic blocks while also working in a university. The role saw him working with Colette Mann, with who he had previously co-starred in theatre work. Paine also secured a guest role in an episode of Nine Network's Bad Mothers.

Aside from television roles, Paine has pursued a theatre career and has secured roles in various national productions. In 1987, he played Michael in The Hope at the Victorian Arts Centre. In 1991, Paine appeared in the stage version of Hair at the Melbourne Athenaeum. He went on to secure a main role in the 1992 Australian tour of Up 'n' Under. In 1993, Paine secured the role of Terry Legge in the production of Big Toys which was held at the Playbox Theatre, Melbourne. That year Paine was appearing in the theatrical comedy titled "Shear Madness", alongside Colette Mann. In April 1996, he played Marlowe in Murder to Die For, which was produced as part of the Melbourne International Comedy Festival. In May 1997, Paine joined his former Neighbours colleague Annie Jones in the production of Effie – Exposed.

In April 2000, Paine starred in the stage production of The Linda Blair Witch Project at the Melbourne Town Hall. He then appeared in theatre production of It's A Dad Thing! for its Australian tour. In 2011, he wrote and acted a play show titled Unpack This, which debuted at the Melbourne Fringe Festival. The show was based on Paine's own experience attending a one day anger management work shop following a dispute with a neighbour. His show then went on tour around Victoria. In 2019, Paine and Mann worked together again creating their own improvisational show Mann Up and Take the Paine. The show, which also served as an acting class, played during the Melbourne International Comedy Festival.

Personal life
Paine is the youngest of six children. He graduated from Victorian College of the Arts in 1985. Paine later became the father of twins. Outside of acting, Paine secured work as a content curator and blogger at Monash University. Other jobs include time as a consultant for ABC and the Seven Network. He also created his own independent production company producing corporate communications for retail, government and non-profit organisations. Paine is the Councillor for Wingrove Ward in the Nillumbik Council and is currently serving the 2020-2024 term.

Filmography

Sources:

References

External links
 Official website
 

Living people
21st-century Australian male actors
Australian male television actors
Australian male soap opera actors
Victorian College of the Arts alumni
Year of birth missing (living people)